The 1934 Chicago Cardinals season was their 15th in the National Football League. The team improved on its previous output of 1–9–1, winning five games, failing to qualify for the playoffs for the ninth consecutive season. Despite shutting out five opponents, the team was shutout four times; nine of the eleven games left one team scoreless. The Cardinals had only 302 yards passing the entire season, which remains an NFL record.

Schedule

Standings

References

1934
Chicago Cardinals
Chicago